Ballynanny may refer to:
Ballynanny (Annaclone), a townland in Iveagh Upper, Upper Half, County Down, Northern Ireland
Ballynanny (Clonduff), a townland in Iveagh Upper, Lower Half, County Down, Northern Ireland